In mathematics, isogeny theorem may refer to:
Raynaud's isogeny theorem
Tate's isogeny theorem